Willkommia is a genus of plants in the grass family. The genus has a disjunct distribution, with species native to Southern Africa, South America, and the United States.

Species
 Accepted species
 Willkommia annua Hack. - Angola, Namibia
 Willkommia newtonii Hack. - Angola, Namibia
 Willkommia sarmentosa Hack. - Angola, Namibia, Zambia, Zimbabwe, Botswana, Cape Province, KwaZulu-Natal
 Willkommia texana Hitchc. - United States (Texas, Oklahoma), Argentina, Uruguay

References

Chloridoideae
Poaceae genera
Grasses of Africa
Grasses of North America
Grasses of South America
Taxa named by Eduard Hackel